Alfried Felix Alwyn Krupp von Bohlen und Halbach (13 August 1907 – 30 July 1967), often referred to as Alfried Krupp, was a German industrialist, a competitor in Olympic yacht races, and a member of the Krupp family, which has been prominent in German industry since the early 19th century. He was convicted after World War II of crimes against humanity for the genocidal manner in which he operated his factories (with the use of slave labor) and sentenced to twelve years in prison subsequently commuted to three years with time served in 1951.

The family company, known formally as Friedrich Krupp AG Hoesch-Krupp, was a key supplier of weapons and materiel to the German Government and the Wehrmacht during World War II. In 1943, Krupp became sole proprietor of the company, following the Lex Krupp ("Krupp Law") decreed by Adolf Hitler.  Krupp's wartime employment of slave labor resulted in the "Krupp Trial" of 1947–1948, following which he served three years in prison. At Krupp's behest, after his death in 1967, control of the Krupp company passed to the Alfried Krupp von Bohlen und Halbach Foundation, a philanthropic organisation.

Family and early life

Krupp's mother, Bertha Krupp, inherited the company in 1902 at the age of 16 when her father, Friedrich Alfred Krupp committed suicide after being exposed in the newspapers as a homosexual.  In October 1906, Bertha married Alfried's father, Gustav von Bohlen und Halbach, a German diplomat and member of the nobility in a Lutheran ceremony, who subsequently added the Krupp name to his own by permission of Emperor Wilhelm II.  Alfried was born almost a year later.

Alfried Krupp attended grammar school, after which he trained at the Krupp company workshops and studied metallurgy at technical universities in Munich, Berlin and Aachen. The company profited significantly from the German re-armament of the 1920s and 1930s. Gustav Krupp von Bohlen und Halbach, in spite of his initial opposition to the Nazi Party, made significant personal donations to it before the 1933 election, because he saw advantages for the company in the Nazis' militarism and their opposition to independent trade unions. From 1931, Alfried was a supporting member of the SS (förderndes Mitglied der SS). He was a member of the National Socialist Flyers Corps, where he reached the rank of Standartenfuhrer and from 1938 he was a member of the Nazi Party. In 1937, Krupp – like his father – was appointed military economic leader (Wehrwirtschaftsführer). He was also a deputy of his father in his capacity as Chairman of the Board of the Adolf Hitler Fund of German Trade and Industry (Adolf-Hitler-Spende der deutschen Wirtschaft).

Krupp received a Diplomingenieur (Master of Engineering) from the Aachener Technische Hochschule in 1934, with the acceptance of a thesis on melting steel in vacuums. During the Berlin Olympics of 1936, Krupp participated in 8 Meter Class sailing and won a bronze medal. In the same year, after undergoing financial training at the Dresdner Bank, Krupp joined the family company. In the following year he married Anneliese Lampert, née Bahr (1909–1998); their son, Arndt, was born in 1938.

World War II 
During World War II, the company's profits increased and it took control of factories confiscated by the German army in Nazi-occupied Europe. Alfried became more active in controlling the company as his father's health declined.  He became de facto head of the firm in 1941 when Gustav Krupp suffered a stroke. Under Alfried, the company used slave labor supplied by the government and often assigning Jewish prisoners from concentration camps to work in many of its factories. Even when the military suggested that security reasons dictated that some work should be performed by free German workers, Alfried insisted on using forced labour.

He officially replaced his father as head of the family firm under the Lex Krupp ("Krupp Law"), proclaimed by Adolf Hitler on 12 November 1943, which set aside the usual laws of inheritance and preserved the Krupp firm as a family business.  Under this law, Alfried formally added the Krupp name to his own.  He was also appointed Reichsminister für Rüstung und Kriegsproduktion ("Minister for Armament and War Production"). The transfer of ownership was a gesture of gratitude by Hitler and was to be one of only a few major National Socialist government laws that survived the fall of the regime. During the war, Alfried Krupp was responsible for the transfer of certain factories in the occupied territories to the German Reich. He was awarded the War Merit Cross, Second and First Class.

Krupp worked closely with the SS, which controlled the concentration camps from which forced labor was obtained. In a letter dated 7 September 1943, he wrote: "As regards the cooperation of our technical office in Breslau, I can only say that between that office and Auschwitz the closest understanding exists and is guaranteed for the future." According to one of his own employees, even when it was clear that the war was lost: "Krupp considered it a duty to make 520 Jewish girls, some of them little more than children, work under the most brutal conditions in the heart of the concern, in Essen."

Post-war life and the Krupp Trial

After the war, the Allied Military Government investigated Krupp's employment of slave laborers. He was convicted of crimes against humanity and sentenced to 12 years imprisonment and the forfeiture of all property. 
In the Krupp trial, it was alleged by the prosecution that the accused (Alfried Krupp and eleven other associates) had committed Crimes against Peace, War Crimes and Crimes against Humanity, and participated in a common plan and conspiracy, all as defined in Control Council Law No.10 of 20 December 1945. The Krupp Trial was the tenth of a series of twelve military tribunals (which became known as the Nuremberg Trials) for war crimes against members of the leadership of Nazi Germany. The Indictment filed against the 12 accused made detailed allegations which were arranged under four counts:
		
 Planning, preparation, initiation and waging aggressive war 
 		Plunder and spoliation 
 		Crimes involving prisoners of war and slave labor 
 		Common plan or conspiracy

All of the accused except one were found guilty of having, contrary to the provisions of international law, employed prisoners of war, foreign civilians, and concentration camp inmates under inhumane conditions in work connected with the conduct of war. Acts and conduct of the accused said by the Prosecution to have been committed unlawfully, knowingly and wilfully.

Krupp was sentenced to twelve years imprisonment. He did not, however, accept any guilt. In 1947, he stated:

The economy needed a steady or growing development. Because of the rivalries between the many political parties in Germany and the general disorder there was no opportunity for prosperity. ... We thought that Hitler would give us such a healthy environment. Indeed he did do that. ... We Krupps never cared much about [political] ideas. We only wanted a system that worked well and allowed us to work unhindered. Politics is not our business.
— Alfried Krupp, in Golo Mann's manuscript first published in Friz, 1988.

However, after three years, John J. McCloy, the American High Commissioner for Germany, arranged for Krupp to be released on time served and the forfeiture of his property was reversed under political pressure. Nevertheless, certain parts of his assets were considered for reparations and he had limits on business activities imposed on him. Krupp's second marriage on 19 May 1952 to Vera Hossenfeld (1909–1967), just after his release from Landsberg Prison, ended in a scandal and a settlement in 1957.

Prior to Krupp's death from lung cancer, his assistant, Berthold Beitz, worked to transfer control of the company to a Stiftung (foundation), called the Alfried Krupp von Bohlen und Halbach Foundation, to be monitored by three members of a supervisory board, including Hermann Josef Abs, of the former Deutsch-Asiatische Bank A.G. and Deutsche Bank AG. In this agreement, Krupp's son and heir, Arndt, relinquished any claim over his father's businesses, and was to be paid a relatively modest cash amount, in yearly installments, until his own death.

Ancestry

List of institutions and objects named after Alfried Krupp 

 Alfried Krupp College, Jacobs University, Bremen, Germany
Alfried Krupp von Bohlen und Halbach Foundation
, Essen
Alfried Krupp Institute for Advanced Study, Greifswald, Germany
Alfried Krupp PhD Grant

Alfried Krupp Street, Essen, Germany

References

External links
 
 Krupp German Armaments Factory 1942
 Nazi War Criminals Freed 1951 (including A Krupp)
 Krupp's Millions 1952
 Krupp Trial and Nazi Clemency
 The United States of America vs. Alfried Krupp

1907 births
1967 deaths
Nazi war crimes
Unfree labor during World War II
Businesspeople from Essen
Economy of Nazi Germany
German industrialists
German steel industry businesspeople
People from the Rhine Province
Alfried
Olympic bronze medalists for Germany
Olympic sailors of Germany
German male sailors (sport)
Sailors at the 1936 Summer Olympics – 8 Metre
Olympic medalists in sailing
German people convicted of crimes against humanity
People convicted by the United States Nuremberg Military Tribunals
Deaths from lung cancer in Germany
Technical University of Munich alumni
German anti-communists
Förderndes Mitglied der SS
Medalists at the 1936 Summer Olympics
National Socialist Flyers Corps members